John Scott Duarte (born September 9, 1966) is an American politician, businessman, nurseryman and pistachio farmer. A member of the  Republican Party, he has served as the U.S. representative for California's 13th congressional district since 2023.

California’s 13th congressional district was listed as a key competitive House race that could help determine control of the House of Representatives in the 2022 midterm elections. His election was the second-closest in the nation, behind Lauren Boebert's election in Colorado's 3rd congressional district.

Early life and education
Duarte was born on September 9, 1966, in Modesto, California, to Jim and Anita Duarte, and is the grandson of  Portuguese immigrants. He graduated from the University of the Pacific’s Eberhardt School of Business with an MBA and a bachelor’s degree in finance from San Diego State University in 1989.

Early career
In 1989, Duarte began his career as a vice president of sales for Duarte Trees & Vines, which was founded by his parents in 1988. In 2007, he became the company’s chief executive officer and president.

In 2017, Duarte was ordered to pay a $1.1 million fine after he was sued by  USACE, claiming that he had illegally filled wetlands on his wheat field in Tehama County by plowing it, a violation of the Clean Water Act. The lawsuit garnered national attention and lasted over five years.

U.S. House of Representatives
On March 9, 2022, Duarte launched a campaign to represent California's 13th congressional district after the 2020 United States redistricting cycle created a new district based in the Central Valley. He and California state Assemblyman Adam Gray advanced to the general election. He defeated Gray in the 2022 United States House of Representatives elections with 50.2% of the vote. He was declared the winner on December 3, 2022, almost a month after the election.

Tenure
Duarte was sworn into office on January 3, 2023. He supported Kevin McCarthy for Speaker of the United States House of Representatives.

Political positions

Abortion
Duarte is a self-described “moderate” on abortion, and opposes a nationwide abortion ban. He supports access to abortion in the first 12 weeks of pregnancy. Duarte also opposes codifying Roe v. Wade into federal law.

Immigration
Duarte named border security one of his top priorities and one of the main reasons he ran for Congress. He called Florida Governor Ron DeSantis's decision to fly migrants to Democratic-leaning states a "creative idea" during a debate.

Environment
Duarte has said the U.S. has "done its fair share for green energy" and that "America cannot allow ourselves to become less competitive, pursuing green energy fantasies on the backs of working families". During his congressional campaign, he said "several leftist activists" had been arrested for setting wildfires in the Sierra Nevada "to draw attention to global warming".

Electoral history

Personal life 
Duarte lives with his wife Alexandra Duarte on a pistachio and almond farm outside of  Modesto in rural Stanislaus County. They have 4 children.

References

External links 
 
 John Duarte for Congress campaign website
 
 

|-

1966 births
21st-century American politicians
American people of Portuguese descent
Farmers from California
Living people
Republican Party members of the United States House of Representatives from California